Kurasala Kannababu is the Minister of Agriculture and Cooperation in Y. S. Jaganmohan Reddy Ministry of the Indian state of Andhra Pradesh.

He was elected as Member of legislative assembly from Kakinada Rural in 2019 Andhra Pradesh Assembly elections. He was elected as an MLA in 2009 from Praja Rajyam Party and he joined Indian National Congress in 2012 during the merger of Praja Rajyam Party with Indian National Congress. He quit Indian National Congress in 2014 and contested as an Independent in 2014 and joined YSR Congress Party in 2016.

References

Year of birth missing (living people)
Living people
Indian National Congress politicians from Andhra Pradesh
Praja Rajyam Party politicians
YSR Congress Party politicians
Andhra Pradesh MLAs 2019–2024